Chicken Delight is a chain of restaurants offering eat-in, take-out, and delivery service with a menu featuring chicken, pizza, and ribs. Based in Winnipeg, the chain mostly has outlets in that city and throughout Manitoba. Although as of 2019, six Chicken Delight restaurants are located in the New York metro area, none of these are included in the corporate web site list of franchise locations.

History 

The current Chicken Delight operation is a descendant of a much larger chain. Founded in Illinois in 1952, the chain grew during the 1960s to over 1,000 locations. It was purchased in 1964 by Consolidated Foods. The jingle "Don't cook tonight, call Chicken Delight," emphasizing their delivery and take-out services, was widely advertised on American radio and television during the 1960s. In the late 1950s and early 1960s, the chain's mascot was a chicken with a chef's hat, holding a plate of biscuits.

By the late 1960s, Chicken Delight in the US was a troubled operation. While emerging chains like McDonald's ensured that all outlets provided a product that met the franchisor's strict standards, the quality control of Chicken Delight outlets was lax. The company was thus fighting the battle with people who, having had a bad experience in one outlet, generalized that to the entire chain, then told their friends to stay away.

Chicken Delight was simultaneously under increasing pressure from fast-growing competitor Kentucky Fried Chicken (KFC). Although Chicken Delight and KFC were founded the same year, and Chicken Delight had initially expanded far more quickly, KFC was beginning to enter and gaining popularity in many markets. The competition became particularly strong in 1972 when KFC added new "Extra-Crispy" chicken to their menu with a taste and texture similar to Chicken Delight's product. During the early 1970s, legal actions resulted in a substantial reduction in the Chicken Delight chain (see below).

In 1979, Otto Koch, owner of the successful Chicken Delight Canada Ltd., purchased the remnants of the American Chicken Delight operations.

Products 
Chicken Delight serves chicken-based products such as chicken wings, buffalo wings, chicken fingers, and chicken burgers. The chain also offers pizza, popcorn shrimp, ribs, and a variety of side dishes including french fries, onion rings, poutine (mostly in Canadian locations), potato salad, macaroni salad, and coleslaw. The only dessert product that Chicken Delight offers is cheesecake.

The chain also features Pizza and Chicken combos, and individual and family dinners. All the individual dinners come with sides of fries, coleslaw, and a bread roll. The family dinner comes with the same sides as the individual dinners, but gravy is added. The Pizza and Chicken combos consist of a pie and a range from 6-15 pieces of chicken, comes complete with fries and gravy as the sides.

Chicken Delight serves Pepsi products. They come in either cans, 2 liter bottles, or smaller 20 oz. bottles.

Legal cases 

When Chicken Delight was founded, franchisers typically used one of two different methods for collecting revenue. One was to collect 4% to 8% of gross sales, as is typically done now. The other method was to require their franchisees to buy all their equipment and packaging from the franchisor. In the latter scheme Chicken Delight franchisees paid a little extra for each paper cup, each paper plate, the chicken-coating mix, etc., providing the franchisor with income for corporate operations, advertising, and profit. Some franchisees (and their legal representatives) believed this scheme ran afoul of the Sherman Anti-Trust Act, which requires that the franchisor not sell products above fair market value. In the 1960s a lawsuit was filed on behalf of 94 franchisees and, in 1971, the plaintiffs won a precedent-setting ruling from the US 9th Circuit Court of Appeals that broke the franchise contract for all stores and awarded damages to the plaintiffs. (Siegel v. Chicken Delight, 448 F.2d 43 (9th Cir. 1971); reversed in modern times by decisions such as Queen City Pizza v. Domino's Pizza, 124 F.3d 430 (1997).)

The lawsuit win proved to be a Pyrrhic victory because Consolidated Foods (Now Sara Lee Corporation), then-owner of Chicken Delight, abandoned the business in the US, leaving all its former US franchisees to fend for themselves. Today, some of the old US stores operate independently under names reminiscent of the original, such as "Chicken Tonight."

See also
 List of fast-food chicken restaurants

Notes

External links
Chicken Delight website
Restaurants in Manitoba
Fast-food chains of Canada
Fast-food chains of the United States
Companies based in Winnipeg
Fast-food poultry restaurants
Restaurants established in 1952
1952 establishments in Illinois
American companies established in 1952
Fast-food franchises